Walter James Byrne Furlong (born 7 June 2002) is an Irish professional footballer who plays as a left-back for Scottish Premiership team Motherwell, on loan from the academy of Brighton & Hove Albion of the Premier League.

Club career

Shamrock Rovers

Furlong started his youth career at St. Joseph's Boys based in Dublin, before joining Bray Wanderers and then Shamrock Rovers in 2017, where he made his senior debut in April 2019, aged 16.

Brighton & Hove Albion

In July 2019, Furlong joined academy of Premier League side Brighton & Hove Albion. In May 2022, Furlong signed a one-year contract extension until June 2023. He made his professional debut for the first team on 24 August 2022, appearing as a 85th minute substitute in the 3–0 away win at League One side Forest Green Rovers in the second round of the EFL Cup.

Motherwell (loan)

On 31 January 2023 on transfer deadline day, Furlong signed for Scottish Premiership side Motherwell on loan until the end of the season.

Career statistics

References

2002 births
Living people
Republic of Ireland association footballers
Association football defenders
Shamrock Rovers F.C. players
Brighton & Hove Albion F.C. players
Scottish Professional Football League players
Motherwell F.C. players